Spearfish (Lakota: Hočhápȟe) is a city in Lawrence County, South Dakota. The population was 12,193 at the time of the 2020 census.

History
Before the Black Hills Gold Rush of 1876, the area was used by Native Americans (primarily bands of Sioux but others also ranged through the area). Once the gold rush started, the city was founded in 1876 at the mouth of Spearfish Canyon, and was originally called Queen City. Spearfish grew as a supplier of foodstuffs to the mining camps in the hills. Even today, a significant amount of truck farming and market gardening still occurs in the vicinity.

In 1887, the accepted history of gold mining in the Black Hills was thrown into question by the discovery of what has become known as the Thoen Stone. Discovered by Louis Thoen on Lookout Mountain, the stone purports to be the last testament of Ezra Kind who, along with six others, entered the Black Hills in 1833, "got all the gold we could carry" in June 1834, and were subsequently "killed by Indians beyond the high hill." There is corroborating historical evidence for the Ezra Kind party.

In the 20th century, the history of Spearfish was tied to mining and tourism. Architect Frank Lloyd Wright, who visited Spearfish Canyon in 1935, later called the area "unique and unparalleled elsewhere in our country," and wondered, "How is it that I've heard so little of this miracle and we, toward the Atlantic, have heard so much of the Grand Canyon when this is even more miraculous?"

The Homestake Sawmill (previously part of Pope and Talbot, now owned by Neimen Forest Products) was built to supply timbers for the Homestake Mine in Lead (closed January 2002). In 1938, Joseph Meier brought the Luenen Passion Play to settle permanently in Spearfish and become the Black Hills Passion Play, drawing thousands of visitors every year during the summer months. After Meier's death in 2007, the amphitheater and  surrounding it were put up for sale.

Geography
Spearfish is located at  (44.489803, −103.852585).

Spearfish Creek is a fast-moving creek that emerges from Spearfish Canyon at Spearfish. It runs roughly south to north through the center of town (parallel to Canyon Street), year round. The creek freezes from the bottom up instead of icing over. This unusual phenomenon occurs due to the very fast rate at which the creek flows. This speed prevents ice from forming except along the bottom of the creek bed where friction and turbulence allow the water to slow down long enough to freeze. Since the creek continues to flow atop this ice, the water level of the creek gradually rises as more ice accumulates on the bottom, in some cases causing flooding on the north side of town where the channel is not as deep.

Spearfish has been assigned the ZIP code 57783 and the FIPS place code 60020. Black Hills State University has its own ZIP code, 57799.

Climate
Given its location at the base of the Black Hills and its proximity to the High Plains, the climate in Spearfish is highly variable at any time of the year, a phenomenon especially apparent in the winter months. According to the Köppen climate classification, Spearfish has humid continental climate (Dfb).  Snow depth is limited: even in winter half of all days have no snow on the ground, although on average  of snow falls.

World record temperature change
Spearfish holds the world record for the fastest recorded temperature change. On January 22, 1943, at about 7:30 a.m. The  rise in two minutes set a world record that still holds. The  drop took only 27 minutes. The sudden change in temperatures caused glass windows to crack and windshields to instantly frost over.

Demographics

2010 census
As of the census of 2010, there were 10,494 people, 4,644 households, and 2,350 families living in the city. The racial makeup of the city was 93.5% White, 0.4% African American, 2.0% Native American, 1.1% Asian, 0.6% from other races, and 2.3% from two or more races. Hispanic or Latino of any race were 2.7% of the population.

There were 4,644 households, of which 23.1% had children under the age of 18 living with them, 38.5% were married couples living together, 8.9% had a female householder with no husband present, 3.3% had a male householder with no wife present, and 49.4% were non-families. 39.3% of all households were made up of individuals, and 16.9% had someone living alone who was 65 years of age or older. The average household size was 2.09 and the average family size was 2.79.

The median age in the city was 33.2 years. 18.6% of residents were under the age of 18; 20.2% were between the ages of 18 and 24; 22.3% were from 25 to 44; 21.2% were from 45 to 64; and 17.7% were 65 years of age or older. The gender makeup of the city was 47.1% male and 52.9% female.

2000 census
As of the census of 2000, there were 8,606 people, 3,638 households, and 1,931 families living in the city. The population density was 1,409.1 people per square mile (543.8/km2). There were 3,904 housing units at an average density of 639.2 per square mile (246.7/km2). The racial makeup of the city was 95.33% White, 0.35% African American, 2.31% Native American, 0.36% Asian, 0.02% Pacific Islander, 0.33% from other races, and 1.30% from two or more races. Hispanic or Latino of any race were 1.73% of the population. 37.5% were of German, 13.5% Norwegian, 9.6% English and 8.2% Irish ancestry according to Census 2000.

There were 3,638 households, out of which 25.2% had children under the age of 18 living with them, 41.4% were married couples living together, 9.2% had a female householder with no husband present, and 46.9% were non-families. 37.0% of all households were made up of individuals, and 15.5% had someone living alone who was 65 years of age or older. The average household size was 2.15 and the average family size was 2.85.

In the city, the population was spread out, with 20.3% under the age of 18, 21.5% from 18 to 24, 23.3% from 25 to 44, 17.9% from 45 to 64, and 17.1% who were 65 years of age or older. The median age was 32 years. For every 100 females, there were 87.1 males. For every 100 females age 18 and over, there were 83.3 males.

As of 2000 the median income for a household in the city was $26,887, and the median income for a family was $40,257. Males had a median income of $30,242 versus $20,431 for females. The per capita income for the city was $16,565. About 9.8% of families and 17.4% of the population were below the poverty line, including 16.1% of those under age 18 and 9.4% of those age 65 or over.

Radio and TV stations

AM radio

 KBHB 810
 KKLS 920
 KDSJ 980
 KTOQ 1340
 KBFS 1450

FM radio
 KBHU 89.1
 KJKT 90.7
 KRCS 93.1
 KKMK 93.9
 KSQY 95.1
 KZZI 95.9
 KOUT 98.7
 KFXS 100.3
 KDDX 101.1
 KFMH 101.9
 KYDT 103.1
 KIQK 104.1

Television

 KHME Ch. 3 ABC
 KCLO Ch. 16 CBS
 KNBN Ch. 21 NBC
 KBHE-TV Ch. 26 PBS

Education
Spearfish is the home of Black Hills State University, a four-year public university in the South Dakota system. Founded as Spearfish Normal School in 1883, it is still largely a teacher training institution, although its mission has expanded far beyond to include masters programs in Integrative Genomics and Business Administration. It also hosts a summer arts institute, with Spearfish native and international opera star Johanna Meier (daughter of the Black Hills Passion Play founder Joseph Meier) serving as Artistic Director.

Transportation
Spearfish is the headquarters and hometown of two bus and coach transport services, Dakota Trailways and Prairie Hills Transit.

Notable people 
Blacklite District, musical artist and YouTube star
Wendell E. Dunn (1894–1965), born near Summit, South Dakota, educator, former resident
David Eddings, fantasy author who taught at Black Hills State
Johanna Meier, born in Chicago, Illinois, international opera singer
Gary Mule Deer, comedian and country musician
William T. Powers (1820–1909), born in Bristol, New Hampshire, manufacturer, former resident of Spearfish
Bill Russell, Tony-nominated playwright and lyricist, internationally produced author of musicals for the stage
Rich Sattgast, state treasurer
Frank Schoonmaker (1905–1976), born in Spearfish, travel guide writer and wine merchant
Ernie Smith (1909–1985), college and NFL football player and coach
Dick Termes, artist
Jeff Trandahl, 32nd Clerk of the U.S. House of Representatives
Amy Williams, women's basketball head coach, University of Nebraska

References

External links
 
 

 
Black Hills
Cities in Lawrence County, South Dakota
Cities in South Dakota
Populated places established in 1876
Micropolitan areas of South Dakota
Weather extremes of Earth
1876 establishments in Dakota Territory